Smith's Magazine was a Street & Smith magazine published monthly from April 1905 to February 1922.

Created for the "John Smiths" of the world, Theodore Dreiser was its initial editor, and lasted one year in that position before moving to Broadway Magazine.  By the time Dreiser departed, the magazine had a circulation of 125,000.

Charles A. MacLean became editor of Smith's as well as another more successful Street & Smith magazine, The Popular Magazine, for many years.

Originally a story magazine directed at the general public, it later focused on a female audience.  When the magazine ended, Street & Smith merged it and its mainly female readership into the newer, and what proved to be even more successful, Love Story Magazine.

Smith's was the first magazine to publish author Ben Ames Williams, in July 1915.

References

External

 Archive of selected magazine covers

Magazines established in 1905
Magazines disestablished in 1922
Street & Smith
Defunct women's magazines published in the United States
1905 establishments in the United States